The history of human settlement in the west Indian state of Rajasthan dates back to about 5,000 years ago. This region was inhabited during great floods after the ice age as well. This area was known as Matsya kingdom. It was the site of the Indus Valley Civilization.
The early medieval period saw the rise of many Rajput kingdoms like Pratihars, Chauhans of Ajmer, Guhilot ( also known as Gohil )  and Sisodias of Mewar, Shekhawats  of Shekhawati Sikar, Rathores of Marwar. And some Jat kingdoms of Sinsinwars of Bharatpur, Deswals, Bamraulias and Ranas of Dholpur, Godaras , Saharans, Punias, Johiya of Jangaldesh.

The Pratihar Empire acted as a barrier for Arab invaders from the 8th to the 11th century.it was the power of the Pratihara army that effectively barred the progress of the Arabs beyond the confines of Sindh, their only conquest for nearly 300 years.

After Matsya kingdom this area was known as Rajputana around the time when the Kachwaha migrated to the region. The Kachwahas continued to assist their Rajput allies in many Fatal battles including First Battle of Tarain and later in the disastrous Second Battle of Tarain. The last time where Kachwahas fought for Rajputs was under Rana Sanga of Chittor in the Battle of Khanwa.

Gohils and Sisodia of Chittor, who continue to resist Mughals against heavy odds and gave rise to Maharana Pratap who became a symbol of Rajput valour along with Rana Sanga and Prithviraj Chauhan. After Indian Independence in 1947, the various princely states of Rajasthan were integrated.

The British made several treaties with rulers of Rajasthan and also made allies out of local rulers, who were allowed to rule their princely states. This period was marked by famines and economic exploitation.

Periodization of Rajasthan history 

Pre-historic Period (Stone Age)
 Early Stone Age (c. 10,00,000 – 1,00,000 BCE)
 Middle Stone Age (c. 1,00,000 – 40,000 BCE)
 Later Stone Age (c. 40,000 – 5000 BCE)

Proto-historic Period
 Copper Age (c. 5000 – 3500 BCE)
 Bronze Age (c. 3500 – 1500 BCE)

Iron-Age
 Vedic Period (c. 1500 – 600 BCE)

Ancient-Period

 Ancient Kingdoms of Rajasthan lasted from c. 700 BCE to 300 CE
 In this period Rajasthan was ruled by Kingdoms like Sivi, Salwa, Malava and others.
 These kingdoms also ruled under Maurya Empire & Kushan Empire (c. 300 BCE – 300 CE)

Classical period
 Classical period of Rajasthan lasted from c. 300 to 650 CE
 Many Kingdoms of Rajasthan ruled independently under Gupta Empire &  Pushyabhuti dynasty from (c. 300 – 650 CE)

Rajput period
 Many Rajput & other Kingdoms (not only Rajput many others also) ruled in Rajasthan from (c. 650 – 1200 CE)

Medieval-Period
 Struggle with Muslim Kingdoms from (c. 1200 – 1500 CE)

Post-Medieval period
 Struggle with Mughals (c. 1500 – 1720 CE)and Maratha Empire (c. 1720–1817 CE)

Modern period
 Rajputana was ruled by Princely States under British Empire (c. 1817 – 1948 CE)

Post-independence period
 Unification of Rajasthan (c. 1948 – 1956 CE)

Ancient civilizations of Rajasthan

Indus Valley civilisation sites 

Sindhu–Saraswati civilization, or the Indus Valley civilisation, was a Bronze Age civilisation in the northwestern regions of India, lasting from 3300 BCE to 1300 BCE, and in its mature form from 2600 BCE to 1900 BCE.

 Baror (Sri Ganganagar) and Karanpura (Hanumangarh) are major Indus-Valley Civilization sites of Rajasthan.

Kalibangān (Hanumangarh) 

Kalibangān is a town located in Tehsil Pilibangān in Hanumangarh district. It is also identified as being established in the triangle of land at the confluence of Drishadvati and Sarasvati River. The prehistoric and Pre-Mauryan character of Indus Valley civilization was first identified by Luigi Tessitori at this site. Kalibangan's excavation report was published in its entirety in 2003 by the Archaeological Survey of India, 34 years after the completion of excavations.

The report concluded that Kalibangan was a major provincial capital of the Indus Valley Civilization. Kalibangan is distinguished by its unique "fire altars" and world's earliest attested "ploughed field".It is around 2900 BCE that the region of Kalibangan developed into what can be considered a planned city.

The Kalibangan pre-historic site was discovered by Luigi Pio Tessitori, an Italian Indologist (1887–1919). He was doing some research in ancient Indian texts and was surprised by the character of ruins in that area. He sought help from John Marshall of the Archaeological Survey of India.

The excavation unexpectedly brought to light a twofold sequence of cultures, of which the upper one (Kalibangan I) belongs to the Harappan, showing the characteristic grid layout of a metropolis and the lower one (Kalibangan II) was formerly called pre-Harappan but is now called "Early Harappan or antecedent Harappan". Other nearby sites belonging to IVC include Balu, Kunal, Banawali etc.

Ganeshwar (Sikar and Jhunjhunu) 

Ganeshwar is located near the copper mines of the Sikar-Jhunjhunu area of the Khetri copper belt in Rajasthan. The Ganeshwar-Jodhpura culture has over 80 other sites currently identified.

The period was estimated to be 3000–2000 BCE. Historian Ratna Chandra Agrawala wrote that Ganeshwar was excavated in 1977. Excavations revealed copper objects including arrowheads, spearheads, fish hooks, bangles and chisels. With its microliths and other stone tools, Ganeshwar culture can be ascribed to the pre-Harappan period.

Ganeshwar saw three cultural phases:
 Period 1 (3800 BCE) which was characterized by hunting and gathering communities using chert tools
 Period II (2800 BCE) shows the beginnings of metal work in copper and fired clay pottery
 Period III (1800 BCE) featured a variety of pottery and copper goods being produced.

Matsya Kingdom (c. 1200–345 BCE) 

Matsya Kingdom was one of the solasa (sixteen) Mahajanapadas (great kingdoms). Painted Grey Ware culture (PGW) chiefdoms in the region were succeeded by Northern Black Polished Ware (NBPW) from c. 700–500 BCE, associated with the rise of the great mahajanapada states (mahajanapada states Kuru, Panchala, Matsya, Surasena and Vatsa)

It was located in central India near Kuru. It was founded by Matsya Dwaita, a son of the great emperor Uparachira Vasu.

Geography

To the north of Central Matsya was Kuru. Kuru territories like Yakrilloma were located to the east. To its west was Salwa, and to its northwest was Mahothha. Nishada, Nishadha, and Kuru
territories like Navarashtra were located in south of Matsya.

History and in Kurukshetra War

The entire Matsya royal family came to fight for the Pandavas in the Mahabharata war. Virata came with his brothers, Uttara, and Shankha. Shweta also came from the south with his son Nirbhita.

On the first day, Uttara died fighting Shalya. At the death of his half-brother, Shweta was infuriated and started wreaking havoc in the Kuru armies. Bhishma came and killed him. On the seventh day, Dronacharya killed Shankha and Nirbhita. On the fifteenth day, Dronacharya killed Virata. All of Virata's brothers also died fighting Dronacharya. The remnant of the Matsya army was slaughtered at midnight by Ashwastamma on the eighteenth day.

By the late Vedic period, they ruled a kingdom located south of the Kurus, and west of the Yamuna river which separated it from the kingdom of the Panchalas. It roughly corresponded to Jaipur in Rajasthan, and included the whole of Hindaun, Alwar with portions of Bharatpur as well as South Haryana. The capital of Matsya was at Viratanagari (present-day Bairat) which is said to have been named after its founder king, Virata.

Matsya Union

In the modern era, another United States of Matsya was a brief union of 4 princely states of Bharatpur, Dholpur, Alwar and Karauli temporarily put together from 1947 to 1949. Shobha Ram Kumawat of Indian National Congress was the first and last chief minister of the State from 18 March 1948 until 15 May 1949. Maharaja of Dholpur became its Rajpramukh.

On 15 May 1949, the Matsya Union was merged with Greater Rajasthan, to form the United State of Rajasthan, which later became the state of Rajasthan on 26 January 1950.

Ancient kingdoms of Rajasthan (c. 700 BCE–300 CE)

Northern Rajasthan area
 Salwa
 Yaudheya
 Kanyaka Kingdom
 Dwaita Kingdom
 Amvastha Kingdom

Eastern Rajasthan area
 Nishadha
 Arjunayanas

Central Rajasthan area
 Nishadas

Western Rajasthan area
 Abhira
 Sudra
 Sivi Kingdom
 Sindhu Kingdom

Southern Rajasthan area
 Malava
 Gurjara Kingdom
 Kunti Kingdom

These warrior kingdoms defeated many foreign invaders like Saka, Huna, and others.

Foreign kingdoms ruled in Rajasthan (c. 100–300CE) 
These foreign kingdoms ruled some parts of western & northeast parts of Rajasthan, they also face strong opposition from indigenous kingdoms like Sivi, Arjunayanas, Yaudheya and Malava.

 Western Satraps
 Kushan Empire
 Huna

Later these foreign kingdoms were defeated Satavahanas and Guptas.

Gurjara-Pratihara Empire (c. 550–1036 CE) 

The Gurjar Pratihar Empire acted as a barrier for Arab invaders from the 6th to the 11th century. The chief accomplishment of the Pratihars lies in its successful resistance to foreign invasions from the west, starting in the days of Junaid. Umayyad campaigns in India (740) An alliance of rulers under Nagabhata I defeated the Arabs in 711 CE, and forced them to retreat to Sindh. Historian R. C. Majumdar says that this was openly acknowledged by the Arab writers. He further notes that historians of India have wondered at the slow progress of Muslim invaders in India, as compared with their rapid advance in other parts of the world. Now there seems little doubt that it was the power of the Pratihara army that effectively barred the progress of the Arabs beyond the confines of Sindh, their only conquest for nearly 300 years.

Pratiharas of Mandavyapura (c. 550–860 CE) 

The Pratiharas of Mandavyapura Pratīhāras of Māṇḍavyapura), also known as the Pratiharas of Mandore (or Mandor), were an Indian dynasty. They ruled parts of the present-day Rajasthan between 6th and 9th centuries CE. They first established their capital at Mandavyapura (modern Mandore), and later ruled from Medantaka (modern Merta).

The imperial Pratiharas also claimed descent from the legendary hero Lakshmana. The earliest known historical members of the family are Harichandra and his second wife Bhadra. Harichandra was a Brahmin, while Bhadra came from a Kshatriya noble family. They had four sons: Bhogabhatta, Kakka, Rajjila and Dadda. These four men captured Mandavyapura and erected a rampart there. It is not known where the family lived before the conquest of Mandavyapura.

List of rulers

Rudolf Hoernlé assumed a period of 20 years for each generation, and placed the dynasty's founder Harichandra in c. 640 CE. Baij Nath Puri placed Harichandra in c. 600 CE. R. C. Majumdar, on the other hand, assumed a period of 25 years for each generation, and placed him in c. 550 CE. The following is a list of the dynasty's rulers (IAST names in brackets) and estimates of their reigns, assuming a period of 25 years:

 Harichandra (Haricandra) alias Rohilladhi (r. c. 550 CE)
 Rajilla (r. c. 575 CE)
 Narabhatta (Narabhaṭa) alias Pellapelli (r. c. 600 CE)
 Nagabhata (Nāgabhaṭa) alias Nahada (r. c. 625 CE)
 Tata (Tāta) and Bhoja (r. c. 650 CE)
 Yashovardhana (Yaśovardhana) (r. c. 675 CE)
 Chanduka (Canduka) (r. c. 700 CE)
 Shiluka (Śīluka) alias Silluka (r. c. 725 CE)
 Jhota (r. c. 750 CE)
 Bhilladitya alias Bhilluka (r. c. 775 CE)
 Kakka (r. c. 800 CE)
 Bauka (Bāuka) (r. c. 825 CE)
 Kakkuka (r. c. 861 CE)

Bauka and Kakkuka were sons of Kakka from different mothers. The Jodhpur and Ghantiyala inscriptions of the two step-brothers give same genealogy of the family, except the last two names. Since these two inscriptions were found not far from each other, it appears that Bauka succeeded Kakka (rather than the two dividing Kakka's kingdom).

Pratiharas of Bhinmala (Kannauj) (c. 730–1036 CE) 

Nagabhata I (730–760), was originally perhaps a feudatory of the Chavdas of Bhillamala. He gained prominence after the downfall of the Chavda kingdom in the course of resisting the invading forces led by the Arabs who controlled Sindh. Nagabhata Pratihara I (730–756) later extended his control east and south from Mandor, conquering Malwa as far as Gwalior and the port of Bharuch in Gujarat. He established his capital at Avanti in Malwa, and checked the expansion of the Arabs, who had established themselves in Sind. In Battle of Rajasthan (738 CE), Nagabhata led a confederacy of Pratiharas to defeat the Muslim Arabs who had until then been pressing on victorious through West Asia and Iran.

The Arab chronicler Sulaiman describes the army of the Pratiharas as it stood in 851 CE, "The ruler of Gurjara maintains numerous forces and no other Indian prince has so fine a cavalry. He is unfriendly to the Arabs, still he acknowledges that the king of the Arabs is the greatest of rulers. Among the princes of India there is no greater foe of the Islamic faith than he. He has got riches, and his camels and horses are numerous."

Mihira Bhoja was the Greatest ruler of dynasty, kingdoms which were conquered and acknowledged his Suzerainty includes Travani, Valla, Mada, Arya, Gujaratra,Lata Parvarta 
and Chandelas of Bundelkhand. Bhoja's Daulatpura-Dausa Inscription(AD 843), confirms his rule in Dausa region. Another inscription states that, "Bhoja's territories extended to the east of the Sutlej river."

Mahmud of Ghazni captured Kannauj in 1018, and the Pratihara ruler Rajapala fled. He was subsequently captured and killed by the Chandela ruler Vidyadhara. The Chandela ruler then placed Rajapala's son Trilochanpala on the throne as a proxy. Jasapala, the last Gurjara-Pratihara ruler of Kannauj, died in 1036 CE.

List of rulers

Nagabhata I (730–756), founder of dynasty
Kakustha (756–765)
Devaraja (765–778)
Vatsaraja (778–805)
Nagabhata II (800–833)
Ramabhadra (833–836)
Mihira Bhoja (836–890), Greatest ruler of dynasty
Mahendrapala I (890–910)
Bhoja II (910–913)
Mahipala I (913–944)
Mahendrapala II (944–948)
Devpala (948–954)
Vinaykpala (954–955)
Mahipala II (955–956)
Vijaypala II (956–960)
Rajapala (960–1018)
Trilochanpala (1018–1027)
Jasapala (Yashpala) (1024–1036), last ruler of dynasty

Pratihara Art 

There are notable examples of architecture from the Gurjara-Pratihara era, including sculptures and carved panels. Their temples, constructed in an open pavilion style. One of the most notable Gurjara-Pratihara style of architecture was Khajuraho, built by their vassals, the Chandelas of Bundelkhand

Māru-Gurjara architecture

Māru-Gurjara architecture was developed during Gurjara Pratihara Empire.

Mahavira Jain temple, Osian

Mahavira Jain temple, Osian temple was constructed in 783 CE, making it the oldest surviving Jain temple in western India.

Baroli temples complex

Baroli temples complex are eight temples, built by the Gurjara-Pratiharas, is situated within a walled enclosured.

Other Pratihara branches

Baddoch branch (c. 600–700 CE)
Known Baddoch rulers are:
Dhaddha 1 (600–627)
Dhaddha 2 (627–655)
Jaibhatta (655–700)

Rajogarh branch
Badegujar were rulers of Rajogarh
Parmeshver Manthandev, (885–915)
No records found after Parmeshver Manthandev

Kingdom of Mewar (c. 551–1948 CE)

Guhila dynasty (c. 551–1303 CE) 

The Guhila dynasty ruled the Medapata (modern Mewar) region in present-day Rajasthan state of India.

In the 6th century, three different Guhila dynasties are known to have ruled in present-day Rajasthan:

Guhilas of Nagda-Ahar,
Guhilas of Kishkindha (modern Kalyanpur),
Guhilas of Dhavagarta (present-day Dhor).

None of these dynasties claimed any prestigious origin in their 7th century records. The Guhilas of Dhavagarta explicitly mentioned the Mori (later Maurya) kings as their overlords, and the early kings of the other two dynasties also bore the titles indicating their subordinate status. By the 10th century, the Guhilas of Nagda-Ahar were the only among the three dynasties to have survived. By this time, their political status had increased, and the Guhila kings had assumed high royal titles such as Maharajadhiraja.

During this period, the dynasty started claiming a prestigious origin, stating that its founder Guhadatta was a mahideva (Brahmin) who had migrated from Anandapura (present-day Vadnagar in Gujarat).

R. C. Majumdar theorizes that Bappa achieved a highly significant military success, because of which he gained reputation as the dynasty's founder.

The later bardic chronicles mention a fabricated genealogy, claiming that the dynasty's founder Guhaditya was a son of Shiladitya, the Maitraka ruler of Vallabhi. This claim is not supported by historical evidence.

According to the 977 CE Atpur inscription and the 1083 CE Kadmal inscription, Guhadatta was succeeded by Bhoja, who commissioned the construction of a tank at Eklingji. The 1285 CE Achaleshwar inscription describes him as a devotee of Vishnu. Bhoja was succeeded by Mahendra and Nagaditya. The bardic legends state that Nagaditya was killed in a battle with the Bhils.

Nagaditya's successor Shiladitya raised the political status of the family significantly, as suggested by his 646 CE Samoli inscription, as well as the inscriptions of his successors, including the 1274 CE Chittor inscription and the 1285 CE Abu inscription. R. V. Somani theorizes that the copper and zinc mines at Jawar were excavated during his reign, which greatly increased the economic prosperity of the kingdom.

Mahendra was succeeded by Kalabhoja, who has been identified as Bappa Rawal by several historians including G. H. Ojha.

In the mid-12th century, the dynasty divided into two branches. The senior branch (whose rulers are called Rawal in the later medieval literature) ruled from Chitrakuta (modern Chittorgarh), and ended with Ratnasimha's defeat against the Delhi Sultanate at the 1303 Siege of Chittorgarh. The junior branch ruled from Sesoda with the title Rana, and gave rise to the Sisodia Rajput dynasty.

List of rulers 

Bappaka  (550–566)
Guhaditya / Guhlia (566–580) (Real founder of the dynasty)
Bhoja  (580–602)
Mahendra (I)  (602–616)
Nāga  (616–646)
Śiladitya  (646–661 )
Aparājita  (661–697 )
Mahendra (II)  (697–728)
Bappa Rawal /  Kālabhoja  (728–753)
Khommāṇa (I)	 (753–773)
Mattaṭa  (773–790)
Bhartṛipaṭṭa (I)  (790–813)
Rawalsiṃha  (813–820)
Khommāṇa (II)  (820–853)
Mahāyaka  (853–900)
Khommāṇa (III)  (900–942)
Bhartṛipaṭṭa (II)  (942–943 CE)
Allaṭa	 (943–953 )
Naravāhana  (953–971 )
Śalivāhana	  (971–977 )
Śaktikumāra  (977–993 )
Āmraprasāda  (993–998)
Śuchivarman  (998–1010)
Naravarman  (1010–1035)
Kīrtivarman  (1035–1050)
Yogarāja  (1050–1075)
Vairaṭa 	 (1075–1090)
Vaṃśapāla  (1090–1100)
Vairisiṃha	  (1100–1122)
Vijayasiṃha  (1122–1130)
Vairisiṃha (II)  (1130–1136)
Arisiṃha  (1136–1145)
Choḍa  (1145–1151)
Vikramasiṃha	  (1151–1158)
Raṇasiṃha  (1158–1165 )

Branching of Guhil Dynasty 

 Ranasingh  (1158 CE) During his reign, the Guhil dynasty got divided into two branches.
 First (Rawal Branch)—Kṣemasiṃha, son of Raṇasiṃha, ruled over Mewar by building Rawal Branch.
 Second (Rana Branch)—Rahapa, the second son of Raṇasiṃha started the Rana Branch by establishing Sisoda bases.  Due to his stay in Rana Sisoda hideout, he was later called Sisodia.

Post-split Rawal branch (c. 1165–1303 CE) 

Kṣemasiṃha	  (1165–1172)
Sāmantasiṃha  (1172–1179)
Kumārasiṃha  (1179–1185)
Mathanasiṃha  (1185–1201)
Padmasiṃha  (1201–1213)
Jaitrasiṃha  (1213–1261)
Tejasiṃha  (1261–1273)
Samarasiṃha  (1273–1301)
Ratnasiṃha	 (1301–1303).

Rana branch (c. 1160–1326 CE) 

Rahapa, a son of Ranasimha alias Karna, established the Rana branch. According to the 1652 Eklingji inscription, Rahapa's successors were:

Rahapa/Karna (1160)
Narapati (1185)
Dinakara (1200)
Jasakarna (1218)
Nagapala (1238)
Karnapala (1266)
Bhuvanasimha (1280)
Bhimasimha (1297)
Jayasimha (1312)
Lakhanasimha (1318)
Arisimha (Arasi) (1322)
Hammir Singh (1326)

Sisodia dynasty (c. 1326–1948 CE) 

The Sisodia dynasty traced its ancestry to Rahapa, a son of the 12th century Guhila king Ranasimha. The main branch of the Guhila dynasty ended with their defeat against the Khalji dynasty at the Siege of Chittorgarh (1303). In 1326, Rana Hammir who belonged to a cadet branch of that clan; however reclaimed control of the region, re-established the dynasty, and also became the propounder of the Sisodia dynasty clan, a branch of the Guhila dynasty, to which every succeeding Maharana of Mewar belonged, the Sisodias regain control of the former Guhila capital Chittor.

The most notable Sisodia rulers were Rana Hamir (r. 1326–64), Rana Kumbha (r. 1433–68), Rana Sanga (r.1508–1528) and Rana Pratap (r. 1572–97). The Bhonsle clan, to which the Maratha empire's founder Shivaji belonged, also claimed descent from a branch of the royal Sisodia family. Similarly, Rana dynasty of Nepal also claimed descent from Ranas of Mewar.

List of rulers 

 Hammir Singh (1326–1364), founder of dynasty
 Kshetra Singh (1364–1382)
 Lakha Singh (1382–1421)
 Mokal Singh (1421–1433)
 Rana Kumbha (1433–1468)
 Udai Singh I (1468–1473)
 Rana Raimal (1473–1508)
 Rana Sanga (1508–1527), Under his rule Mewar reached its pinnacle in power and prosperity.
 Ratan Singh II (1528–1531)
 Vikramaditya Singh (1531–1536)
 Vanvir Singh (1536–1540)
 Udai Singh II (1540–1572) 
 Maharana Pratap (1572–1597), 13th king of Mewar, notable for his military resistance against the Mughals.
 Amar Singh I (1597–1620) 
 Karan Singh II (1620–1628)
 Jagat Singh I (1628–1652)
 Raj Singh I (1652–1680)
 Jai Singh (1680–1698)
 Amar Singh II (1698–1710)
 Sangram Singh II (1710–1734)
 Jagat Singh II (1734–1751)
 Pratap Singh II (1751–1754)
 Raj Singh II (1754–1762)
 Ari Singh II (1762–1772)
 Hamir Singh II (1772–1778)
 Bhim Singh (1778–1828)
 Jawan Singh (1828–1838)
 Sardar Singh (1838–1842)
 Swarup Singh of Udaipur (1842–1861)
 Shambhu Singh (1861–1874)
 Sajjan Singh (1874–1884)
 Fateh Singh (1884–1930)
 Bhupal Singh (1930–1948), last ruler of dynasty

Titular Maharanas 

 Bhupal Singh (1948–1955)
 Bhagwat Singh Mewar
 Mahendra Singh Mewar

Bhati Kingdom of Jaisalmer (c. 600–1949 CE)

Bhati comes from Bhatner and take control of this region. The Maharajas of Jaisalmer trace their lineage back to Jaitsimha, a ruler of a Bhati clan, through Deoraj, a famous prince of the Yaduvanshi Bhati, Rajput ruler during the 9th century. With him the title of "Rawal" commenced. "Rawal" means "of the Royal house".

History

According to legend, Deoraj was to marry the daughter of a neighbouring chief. Deoraj's father and 800 of his family and followers were surprised and massacred at the wedding. Deoraj escaped with the aid of a Brahmin yogi who disguised the prince as a fellow Brahmin. When confronted by the rival chief's followers hunting for Deoraj, the Brahmin convinced them that the man with him was another Brahmin by eating from the same dish, something no Brahmin holy man would do with someone of another caste. Deoraj and his remaining clan members were able to recover from the loss of so many such that later he built the stronghold of Derawar.
Deoraj later captured Laudrava (located about 15 km to the south-east of Jaisalmer) from another Rajput clan and made it his capital.

The major opponents of the Bhati were the Rathor clans of Jodhpur and Bikaner. They used to fight battles for the possession of forts and waterholes as from early times the Jaisalmer region had been criss-crossed by camel caravan trade routes which connected northern India and central Asia with the ports of Gujarat on the Arabian Sea coast of India and hence on to Persia and Arabia and Egypt. Jaisalmer's location made it ideally located as a staging post and for imposing taxes on this trade.

The Bhati rulers originally ruled parts of Afghanistan; their ancestor Rawal Gaj is believed to have founded the city of Gajni. According to James Tod, this city is present-day Ghazni in Afghanistan, while Cunningham identifies it as modern-day Rawalpindi.          His descendant Rawal Salivahan is believed to have founded the city of Sialkot and made it his new capital. Salivahan defeated the Saka Scythians in 78 CE at Kahror, assuming the title of Saka-ari (foe of the Sakas). Salivahan's grandson Rawal Bhati conquered several neighbouring regions. It is from him that the Bhati clan derives its name.

Derawar fort

Derawar fort was first built in the 9th century CE by Rai Jajja Bhati, a Hindu Rajput ruler of the Bhati clan, as a tribute to Rawal Deoraj Bhati the king of  Jaisalmer and Bahawalpur. The fort was initially known as Dera Rawal, and later referred to as Dera Rawar, which with the passage of time came to be pronounced Derawar, its present name.

Medieval rule

In 1156, Rawal Jaisal established his new capital in the form of a mud fort and named it Jaisalmer after himself.

The first Jauhar of Jaisalmer occurred in 1294, during the reign of Turkic ruler of Delhi, Alauddin Khalji. It was provoked by Bhatis' raid on a massive treasure caravan being transported on 3000 horses and mules.

British Raj

In 1818, the Rawals of Jaisalmer State signed a treaty with the British, and 
was guaranteed the royal succession. Jaisalmer was one of the last rajput states to sign a treaty with the British. Jaisalmer was forced to invoke the provisions of the treaty and call on the services of the British in 1829 to avert a war with Bikaner and 10 years later in 1839 for the First Anglo-Afghan War.

List of rulers

Early rulers

Jaisimha, While the genealogy of the Bhatti Rajputs is known, it does seem to be approximate, and is poorly dated. Only a few names stand out and can be linked to historical events, and not reliably so until the twelfth century.
Bahubal
Subahu
Rajh
Gaj
Salivahan
Baland
Bhati
Mangal Rao
Majam Rao
Kehar / Ehar I (773–806)
Tano (806–821)
Bijairai I (821–853)
Deoraj / Devraj (853–908)
Mund / Mundh (908–979)
Bachharajat / Bijairaj II (979–1044)
Dusaj (1044–1124)
Lanja
Bhojdev / Bhojdeo

Rawals 

Rawal Jaisal Singh
(1153–1168), official founder of kingdom, early Bhatti capital at Lodorva (Ludarva) is ransacked and laid waste Muhammad of Ghor. Nevertheless, he and Jaisal patch up their differences and Jaisal goes on to kill his own brother and nephew in battle with the help of Muhammad Ghor A new capital is established when Jaisal founds the city of Jaisalmer.
Rawal Shalivahan Singh II (1168–1200)
Rawal Baijal Singh (1200–1200)
Rawal Kailan Singh (1200–1219)
Rawal Chachak Deo Singh (1219–1241)
Rawal Karan Singh I (1241–1271)
Rawal Lakhan Sen (1271–1275)
Rawal Punpal Singh (1275–1276)
Rawal Jaitsi Singh I Rawal Jethsi (1276–1294), The Bhati Rajput leader Jethsi faces an eight year siege by Sultan Aladin Khilji of Delhi. Tradition has it that when the Bhatti Rajputs are sure of their impending defeat, they kill their womenfolk, with some committing 'Jauhar' by jumping into the fire lest they be defiled by the enemy. The males, the warriors, march from the fort, heading straight for their enemy and a final massacre. Eventually some surviving Bhattis reoccupy the fort.
Rawal Mulraj Singh I (1294–1295)
Rawal Durjan Sal (Duda) (1295–1306), The second Jauhar takes place under similar circumstances, this time against Sultan Ferozshah of Delhi.
Rawal Gharsi Singh (1306–1335)
Rawal Kehar Singh II (1335–1402)
Rawal Lachhman Singh (1402–1436)
Rawal Bersi Singh (1436–1448)
Rawal Chachak Deo Singh II (1448–1457)
Rawal Devidas Singh (1457–1497)
Rawal Jaitsi Singh II (1497–1530)
Rawal Karan Singh II (1530–1530)
Rawal Lunkaran Singh (1530–1551), The third Jauhar takes place when a local Afghan chief by the name of Amir Ali attacks Jaisalmer, one of many Afghans settled in north-western India. This time around the army of Jaisalmer is victorious in its defence. Lunakaran also fights Moghul emperor, Humayun as the emperor passes through on his way to Ajmer.
Rawal Maldev Singh (1551–1562)
Rawal Harraj Singh (1562–1578), The Moghul king Akbar gains the submission of Jaisalmer, along with the other Rajputs of Bikaner, Bundi, and Jodhpur
Rawal Bhim Singh (1578–1624), Bhim Singh forms a matrimonial alliance with the Moghuls when he marries his daughter to Raja Raj Singh of Bikaner. The raja's own daughter is married to Prince Salim, son of Akbar (later to be the Emperor Jehangir).
Rawal Kalyan Singh (1624–1634)
Rawal Manohar Das Singh (1634–1648)
Rawal Ram-Chandra Singh (1648–1651)
Rawal Sabal Singh (1651–1661), Sahal Singh assists Moghul Emperor Shah Jahan in his Peshawar campaign. He also extends his kingdom and comes into conflict with the Bikaner Rathors.

Maharawals 

Maharawal Amar Singh of Jaisalmer (1661–1702)
Maharawal Jaswant Singh of Jaisalmer (1702–1708)
Maharawal Budh Singh (1708–1722)
Maharawal Akhi Singh (1722–1762)
Maharawal Mulraj II (1762–1820), Attacks by the Jodhpur Rathors begin during the reign of Mulraj Singh II. Mulraj Singh signs a treaty with the British for protection.
Maharawal Gaj Singh (1820–1846)
Maharawal Ranjit Singh of Jaisalmer (1846–1864)
Maharawal Bairi Sal (1864–1891)
Maharawal Shalivahan Singh III (1891 –1914)
Maharawal Jawahir Singh (1914–1947)
 Girdhar Singh (1949–1950), last ruler of kingdom merge state with Rajasthan Union in 1949 CE.

Titular kings 

 Raghunath Singh (1950–1982)
 Brijraj Singh (1982–2020)
 Chaitanya Raj Singh (2020–Till Present)

Chahamana (Chauhan) Empire (c. 650–1315 CE) 

Chauhan dynasty or Chahamana dynasty was a great power from 6th 12th Century, Chauchan dynasty ruled more than 400 years.
Chauchan was a Rajput dynasty that ruled modern parts of Rajasthan, Haryana, Madhya Pradesh & Delhi. They sacrificed all they have & also self for protecting of Motherland from Maleechas.
Chahamanas were classifies the dynasty among the four Agnivanshi Rajput clans, whose ancestors are said to have come out of Agnikund sacrificial fire pit. The earliest sources to mention this legend are the 16th century recensions of Prithviraj Raso.

 The ruling dynasties belonging to the Chauhan clan included:-

Chahamanas of Shakambhari (Chauhans of Ajmer)
 Chahamanas of Naddula (Chauhans of Nadol)
 Chahamanas of Jalor (Chauhans of Jalore); branched off from the Chahamanas of Naddula
 Chahamanas of Ranastambhapura (Chauhans of Ranthambore); branched off from the Chahamanas of Shakambhari
 Chahamanas of Lata
 Chahamanas of Dholpur
 Chahamanas of Partabgarh

 The princely states ruled by families claiming Chauhan descent include:-
 Bundi State
 Changbhakar State
 Korea State
 Kota State
 Sirohi State
 Sonepur State
 Ambliara State

Chahamanas of Shakambhari (c. 650–1194 CE)

The Chahamanas of Shakambhari (IAST: Cāhamāna), colloquially known as the Chauhans of Sambhar, were a dynasty that ruled parts of the present-day Rajasthan and its neighbouring areas in India, between 6th and 12th centuries. The territory ruled by them was known as Sapadalaksha. They were the most prominent ruling family of the Chahamana (Chauhan) clan, and were categorized among Agnivanshi Rajputs in the later medieval legends.

The Chahamanas originally had their capital at Shakambhari (present-day Sambhar Lake Town). Until the 10th century, they ruled as Pratihara vassals. When the Pratihara power declined after the Tripartite Struggle, the Chahamana ruler Simharaja assumed the title Maharajadhiraja. In the early 12th century, Ajayaraja II moved the kingdom's capital to Ajayameru (modern Ajmer). For this reason, the Chahamana rulers are also known as the Chauhans of Ajmer.

Territory 

As the Chahamana territory expanded, the entire region ruled by them came to be known as Sapadalaksha. or Jangladesh. This included the later Chahamana capitals Ajayameru (Ajmer) and Shakambhari (Sambhar). The term also came to be applied to the larger area captured by the Chahamanas. The early medieval Indian inscriptions and the writings of the contemporary Muslim historians suggest that the following cities were also included in Sapadalaksha:-
Hansi (now in Haryana), Mandore (now in Marwar region), and Mandalgarh (now in Mewar region).

History 

The earliest historical Chahamana king is the 6th century ruler Vasudeva.

The Ana Sagar lake in Ajmer was commissioned by the Chahamana ruler Arnoraja.
The subsequent Chahamana kings faced several Ghaznavid raids. Ajayaraja II (r. c. 1110–1135 CE) repulsed a Ghaznavid attack, and also defeated the Paramara king Naravarman. He moved the kingdom's capital from Shakambhari to Ajayameru (Ajmer), a city that he either established or greatly expanded. His successor Arnoraja raided the Tomara territory, and also repulsed a Ghaznavid invasion. However, he suffered setbacks against the Gujarat Chaulukya kings Jayasimha Siddharaja and Kumarapala, and was killed by his own son Jagaddeva.

Arnoraja's younger son Vigraharaja IV greatly expanded the Chahamana territories, and captured Delhi from the Tomaras.
The most celebrated ruler of the dynasty was Someshvara's son Prithviraja III, better known as Prithviraj Chauhan. He defeated several neighbouring kings, including the Chandela ruler Paramardi in 1182–83, although he could not annex the Chandela territory to his kingdom. In 1191, he defeated the Ghurid king Muhammad of Ghor at the first Battle of Tarain. However, the next year, he was defeated at the second Battle of Tarain, and subsequently killed.

Muhammad of Ghor appointed Prithviraja's son Govindaraja IV as a vassal. Prithviraja's brother Hariraja dethroned him, and regained control of a part of his ancestral kingdom. Hariraja was defeated by the Ghurids in 1194 CE. Govindaraja was granted the fief of Ranthambore by the Ghurids. There, he established a new branch of the dynasty.

Cultural achievements 

The Chahamanas commissioned a number of Hindu temples, several of which were destroyed by the Ghurid invaders after the defeat of Prithviraja III.

Multiple Chahamana rulers contributed to the construction of the Harshanatha temple, which was probably commissioned by Govindaraja I. According to Prithviraja Vijaya:

 Simharaja commissioned a large Shiva temple at Pushkar
 Chamundaraja commissioned a Vishnu temple at Narapura (modern Narwar in Ajmer district)
 Prithviraja I built a food distribution centre (anna-satra) on the road to Somnath temple for pilgrims.
 Someshvara commissioned a number of temples, including five temples in Ajmer.
Vigraharaja IV was known for his patronage to arts and literature, and himself composed the play Harikeli Nataka. The structure that was later converted into the Adhai Din Ka Jhonpra mosque was constructed during his reign.

List of rulers 

Following is a list of Chahamana rulers of Shakambhari and Ajmer, with approximate period of reign, as estimated by R. B. Singh:

 Chahamana (Legendary)
 Vasu-deva (c. 650–684 CE), first known ruler of the dynasty
 Samanta-raja (c. 684–709 CE); identified as the legendary Manik Rai by R. B. Singh
 Nara-deva (c. 709–721 CE)
 Ajaya-raja I (c. 721–734 CE), alias Jayaraja or Ajayapala
 Vigraha-raja I (c. 734–759 CE)
 Chandra-raja I (c. 759–771 CE)
 Gopendra-raja (c. 771–784 CE)
 Durlabha-raja I (c. 784–809 CE)
 Govinda-raja I (c. 809–836 CE), alias Guvaka I
 Chandra-raja II (c. 836–863 CE)
 Govindaraja II (c. 863–890 CE), alias Guvaka II 
 Chandana-raja (c. 890–917 CE)
 Vakpati-raja (c. 917–944 CE); his younger son established the Naddula Chahamana branch
 Simha-raja (c. 944–971 CE)
 Vigraha-raja II (c. 971–998 CE)
 Durlabha-raja II (c. 998–1012 CE)
 Govinda-raja III (c. 1012–1026 CE)
 Vakpati-raja II (c. 1026–1040 CE)
 Viryarama (c. 1040 CE)
 Chamunda-raja (c. 1040–1065 CE)
 Durlabha-raja III (c. 1065–1070 CE), alias Duśala
 Vigraha-raja III (c. 1070–1090 CE), alias Visala
 Prithvi-raja I (c. 1090–1110 CE)
 Ajaya-raja II (c. 1110–1135 CE), moved the capital to Ajayameru (Ajmer)
 Arno-raja (c. 1135–1150 CE), alias Ana
 Jagad-deva (c. 1150 CE)
 Vigraha-raja IV (c. 1150–1164 CE), alias Visaladeva
 Apara-gangeya (c. 1164–1165 CE)
 Prithvi-raja II (c. 1165–1169 CE)
 Someshvara (c. 1169–1178 CE)
 Prithvi-raja III (c. 1178–1192 CE), better known as Prithviraj Chauhan also Greatest ruler of dynasty
 Govinda-raja IV (c. 1192 CE); banished by Hari-raja for accepting Muslim suzerainty; established the Chahamana branch of Ranastambhapura
 Hari-raja (c. 1193–1194 CE), last ruler of dynasty

Chahamanas of Naddula (c. 950–1197 CE) 

The Chahamanas of Naddula, also known as the Chauhans of Nadol, were an Indian dynasty. They ruled the Marwar area around their capital Naddula (present-day Nadol in Rajasthan) between 10th and 12th centuries.
The Chahamanas of Naddula were an offshoot of the Chahamanas of Shakambhari. Their founder was Lakshmana (alias Rao Lakha) was the son of the 10th century Shakambari ruler Vakpatiraja I. His brother Simharaja succeeded their father as the Shakambhari ruler. The subsequent rulers fought against the neighbouring kingdoms of the Paramaras of Malwa, the Chaulukyas, the Ghaznavids,. The last ruler Jayata-simha was probably defeated by Qutb al-Din Aibak in 1197 CE.

List of rulers 

Following is a list of Chahmana rulers of Naddula, with approximate period of reign, as estimated by R. B. Singh:

 Lakshmana (c. 950–982), alias Rao Lakha or Lakhana
 Shobhita (c. 982–986)
 Baliraja (c. 986–990)
 Vigrahapala (c. 990–994)
 Mahindra (c. 994–1015), alias Mahindu or Mahendra
 Ashvapala (c. 1015–1019)
 Ahila (c. 1019–1024)
 Anahilla (c. 1024–1055)
 Balaprasada (c. 1055–1070)
 Jendraraja (c. 1070–1080)
 Prithvipala (c. 1080–1090)
 Jojalladeva (c. 1090–1110)
 Asharaja (c. 1110–1119), alias Ashvaraja
 Ratnapala (c. 1119–1132)
 Rayapala (c. 1132–1145)
 Katukaraja (c. 1145–1148)
 Alhanadeva (c. 1148–1163)
 Kelhanadeva (c. 1163–1193)
 Jayatasimha (c. 1193–1197), last ruler of dynasty

Chahamanas of Jalor (c. 1160–1311 CE)

The Chahamanas of Jalor, also known as the Chauhans of Jalor in vernacular legends, were an Indian dynasty that ruled the area around Jalore in present-day Rajasthan between 1160 and 1311. They branched off from the Chahamanas of Naddula, and then ruled as feudatories of the Chaulukyas of Gujarat. For a brief period, they became independent, but ultimately succumbed to the Delhi Sultanate at the Siege of Jalore.

The Chahamanas of Jalor descended from Alhana, a Chahamana king of the Naddula branch. Originally, the Jalore Fort was controlled by a branch of the Paramaras until early 12th century. The Chahamanas of Naddula seized its control during Alhana's reign. Kirtipala, a son of Alhana, received a feudal grant of 12 villages from his father and his brother (the crown-prince) Kelhana. He controlled his domains from Suvarnagiri or Sonagiri, the hill on which Jalore Fort is located. Because of this, the branch to which he belonged came to be known as Sonagara.

List of rulers 

The Chahamana rulers of the Jalor branch, with their estimated periods of reign, are as follows:
 Kirti-pala (c. 1160–1182 CE)
 Samara-simha (c. 1182–1204 CE)
 Udaya-simha (c. 1204–1257 CE)
 Chachiga-deva (c. 1257–1282 CE)
 Samanta-simha (c. 1282–1305 CE)
 Kanhada-deva (c. 1292–1311 CE)
 Virama-deva (1311 CE); crowned during the Siege of Jalore, but died 2 days later.

Chahamanas of Ranastambhapura (c. 1192–1301 CE)

The Chahamanas of Ranastambhapura were a 13th-century Indian dynasty. They ruled the area around their capital Ranastambhapura (Ranthambore) in present-day Rajasthan, initially as vassals of the Delhi Sultanate, and later as sovereigns. They belonged to the Chahamana (Chauhan) clan, and are also known as Chauhans of Ranthambore in vernacular Rajasthani bardic literature.

The Chahamana line of Ranastambhapura was established by Govindaraja, who agreed to rule as a vassal of the Ghurids in 1192, after they defeated his father, the Shakambhari Chahamana king Prithviraja III. Govindaraja's descendants gained and lost their independence to the Delhi Sultanate multiple times during the 13th century.
Hammira, the last king of the dynasty, adopted an expansionist policy, and raided several neighbouring kingdoms. The dynasty ended with his defeat against the Delhi Sultan Alauddin Khalji at the Siege of Ranthambore in 1301.

List of rulers 

 Govinda-raja (1192 CE), founder of dynasty
 Balhana-deva or Balhan, son of Govinda
 Prahlada or Prahlad, son of Balhana
 Viranarayana or Vir Narayan, son of Prahlada
 Vagabhata, son of Balhana; known as Bahar Deo in bardic chronicles
 Jaitra-simha or Jaitra Singh
 Hammira-deva or Hammir Dev (1301 CE), last & Greatest ruler of dynasty

Medieval period (c. 1000–1817 CE)

Rajputs before and after Ghurid invasions

In the 12th century before Ghurid invasions much of the Indo-Gangetic Plain region were ruled by the Rajputs. In 1191 Rajput king of Ajmer and Delhi Prithviraj Chauhan unified several Rajput states and defeat the invading Ghurid army near Tarain in First Battle of Tarain, however the Rajputs did not chase the Ghurids and let Mu'izz al-Din escape. As a result, in 1192 CE, Mu'izz al-Din return with an army of an estimated strength of 120,000 Turks, Afghans and Muslim allies and decisively defeated The Rajput Confederacy at Second Battle of Tarain, Prithviraj fled the battleground but was captured near the battle site and executed. The defeat of Rajputs in the battle begins a new chapter in Rajasthan and Indian history as it not only crush Rajput powers in Gangetic Plain but also firmly established a Muslim presence in northern India. In the fatal battle Malesi a Kachwaha Rajput and ally of Prithviraj lead the last stand for the Rajputs against Ghurids and died fighting after Prithviraj tried to escape.

Over the next four centuries there were repeated, though unsuccessful, attempts by the central power based in Delhi to subdue the Rajput states of the region. The Rajputs, however, despite common historical and cultural traditions, were never able to unite to inflict a decisive defeat on their opponents.

The Sisodia Rajputs of Mewar led other kingdoms in its resistance to outside rule. Rana Hammir Singh, defeated the Tughlaq dynasty and recovered a large portion of Rajasthan. The indomitable Rana Kumbha defeated the Sultans of Malwa, Nagaur and Gujarat and made Mewar the most powerful Hindu kingdom in Northern India.

Rajasthan under Rana Sanga

In 1508 Rana Sanga ascended the throne after a long struggle with his brothers. He was an ambitious king under whom Mewar reached its zenith in power and prosperity. Rajput strength under Rana Sanga reached its zenith and threatened to revive their powers again in Northern India. He establish a strong kingdom from Satluj in Punjab in the north until Narmada River in south in Malwa after conquering Malwa and from Sindhu river in west until Bayana in the east. In his military career he defeated Ibrahim Lodhi at the Battle of Khatoli and manage to free most of Rajasthan along with that he establish his control over parts of Uttar Pradesh including Chandwar, he gave the part of U.P to his allies Rao Manik Chand Chauhan who later supported him in Battle of Khanwa. After that Rana Sanga fought another battle with Ibrahim Lodhi known as Battle of Dholpur where again Rajput confederacy were victorious, this time following his victory Sanga conquered much of the Malwa along with Chanderi and bestowed it to one of his vassal Medini Rai. Rai ruled over Malwa with Chanderi as his capital. Sanga also invaded Gujarat with 50,000 Rajput confederacy joined by his three allies. He plundered the Gujarat sultanate and chased the Muslim army as far as capital Ahmedabad. He successfully annexed northern Gujarat and appointed one of his vassals to rule there. Following the victories over the sultans, he successfully established his sovereignty over Rajasthan, Malwa and large parts of Gujarat. In his campaign of Gujarat the Rajputs destroyed around 200 mosques and burnt down several Muslim towns. According to Chaube the campaign was brutal, in which Rajputs kidnapped many Muslim women as captives and sold them in the markets of Rajasthan. According to Gopinath Sharma the campaign not only enhanced Sanga's fame but also due to the Rajputs' religious bigotry in Gujarat Sanga became an eyesore to Muslim. After these victories, he united several Rajput states from Northern India to expel Babur from India and re-establish Hindu power in Delhi. He advanced with an army of 100,000 Rajputs to expel Babur and to expand his territory by annexing Delhi and Agra. The battle was fought for supremacy of Northern India between Rajputs and Mughals.
However the Rajput Confederation suffered a disastrous defeat at Khanwa due to Babur's superior leadership and modern tactics. The battle was more historic and eventful than First Battle of Panipat as it firmly established Mughal rule in India while crushing re-emerging Rajput powers. The battle was also earliest to use cannons, matchlocks, swivel guns and mortars to great use.

The battle also marks the last time in medieval India where the Rajputs stood united against a foreign invader. Although the exact casualties are unknown, it is estimated that all Rajput Houses lost many of their close allies in the battle.

Rana Sanga was removed from the battlefield in unconscious state from his vassals Prithviraj Singh I of Jaipur and Maldeo Rathore of Marwar. After regaining consciousness he took an oath to never return to Chittor until he defeated Babur and conquer Delhi. He also stopped wearing a turban and use to wrap up cloth over his head. While he was preparing to wage another war against Babur he was poisoned by his own nobles who opposed another battle with Babur. He died in Kalpi in January 1528.

After his defeat, his vassal Medini Rai was defeated by Babur at the Battle of Chanderi and Babur captured the capital of Rai kingdom Chanderi. Medini was offered Shamsabad instead of Chanderi as it was historically important in conquering Malwa but Rao refuse the offer and choose to die fighting. The Rajput women and children committed self-immolation to save their honour from the Muslim army. After the victory Babur capture Chanderi along with Malwa which was ruled by Rai. However Babur gave control of Malwa to Ahmed Shah a descendant of Malwa Sultan whose entire Kingdom of Malwa was annexed by Sanga. In this way Babur reinstated Muslim rule in Malwa.

Jat Empire of Jangaldesh ( C. 11th-15th Cen)

Jangladesh, also known as Janglu, was a historical region in north, north-western and north-eastern Rajasthan state in northern India. It included the present-day districts of Bikaner, Churu, Ganganagar, and Hanumangarh. It was bounded on the south by Marwar and Jaisalmer regions, on the east by Ajmer-Merwara region.

Most of Jat clans in Rajasthan had to accept Rathore suzerainty due to Rao Bika's invasion of Jangladesh. Bika led an army of 300 Rajput warriors and subjugated all of the Jat clans of northern Rajasthan. Bika also saved the Jats from the Bhati Rajputs and acted as their buffer. The Godara Jats and Charans were loyal supporters of Bika.

Jat king Pandu Godara of Ladhadia was in love with Malki Kaur, daughter of Jat Raja Raisal Beniwal of Raslana and Princess Malki Kaur also loved him. But her father got her married to Phula Saharan, the Jat king of Bhadag princely state. Princess Malki sent a message through her spy to King Pandu Godara that he should take her, taking this message, Pandu Godara attacked Bhadag with his army and he went away with Malki. Due to his work, other Jat rulers attacked the principality of Pandu Godara and Pandu alone could not fight with them, so he took the help of Rao Jodha 's son Rao Bika , with his help he escaped from Ladhadia but his principality was lost to Ladhadia. After heavy loss, Godara Jats established a new princely state Shekhsar.Established and Pandu Godara donated his entire princely state to Rao Bika in return for his help, which later came to be known as Bikaner state , from here the Jat dynasty ended on Jagladesh and the Rajput dynasty started.

Mughal interference 

The Mughal Emperor Akbar expanded the empire into Rajputana in the 16th century CE. He laid siege to Chittor and defeated the Kingdom of Mewar in 1568. He also laid siege to Ranthambore and defeated the forces of Surjan Hada in the same year.

Akbar also arranged matrimonial alliances to gain the trust of Rajput rulers. He himself married the Rajput princess Jodha Bai. He also granted high offices to a large number of Rajput princes, and maintained cordial relations with them, such as Man Singh, one of the navaratnas. However, some Rajput rulers were not ready to accept Akbar's dominance and preferred to remain independent. Two such rulers were Udai Singh of Mewar and Chandrasen Rathore of Marwar. They did not accept Akbar's supremacy and were at constant war with him. This struggle was continued by Rana Pratap, the successor of Udai Singh. His army met with Akbar's forces at the Battle of Haldighati where he was defeated and wounded. Since then he remained in recluse for twelve years and attacked the Mughals from time to time.

Mughal influence is seen in the styles of Rajput painting and Rajput architecture of the medieval period.

Jat State of Bharatpur (c. 1722-1948 CE)

Bharatpur State, which is also known as the Jat State of Bharatpur historically known as the Kingdom of Bharatpur, was a Hindu Kingdom in the northern part of the Indian subcontinent. It was ruled by the Sinsinwar clan of the Hindu Jats. At the time of reign of king Suraj Mal (1755–1763) revenue of the state was 17,500,000 rupees per annual. 

The formation of the state of Bharatpur was a result of revolts by the Jats living in the region around Delhi, Agra, and Mathura against the Imperial Mughals. Conflict between Jats and Rajputs for zamindari rights also complicated the issue, with Jats primarily being landowners, whereas the Rajputs were primarily revenue collectors. The Jats put up a stiff resistance but by 1691, RajaRam Sinsini and his successor Churaman were compelled to submit to the Imperial Mughals. Rajaram who also exhumed and burned the remains of Akbar is known for setting up a small fort at Sinsini. It was the key foundation of this kingdom.

The most prominent ruler of Bharatpur was Maharaja Suraj Mal. He captured the important Mughal city of Agra on 12 June 1761. He also melted the two silver doors of the famous Mughal monument Taj Mahal. Agra remained in the possession of Bharatpur rulers till 1774. After Maharaja Suraj Mal's death, Maharaja Jawahar Singh, Maharaja Ratan Singh and Maharaja Kehri Singh (minor) under resident ship of Maharaja Nawal Singh ruled over Agra Fort.

Maratha interference (c. 1720–1817 CE) 

Since the early 1700s, the Maratha Empire began expanding northwards, led by Peshwa Baji Rao I of Pune. This expansion finally brought the newly founded Maratha Empire in contact with the Rajputs. Rajasthan saw many invasions by the Marathas, under military leadership of Holkars and Scindhias.

Jat State of Dholpur (c. 1806-1949 CE)

Historically known as the Kingdom of Dholpur, was a kingdom of eastern Rajasthan, India, which was founded in AD 1806 by a Jat ruler Rana Kirat Singh of Gohad. After 1818, the state was placed under the authority of British India's Rajputana Agency. The Ranas ruled the state until the independence of India in 1947, when the kingdom was merged with the Union of India.

Very little is known of the early history of the state. According to tradition a predecessor state was established as Dhavalapura. In 1505 neighboring Gohad State of Rana Jats was founded and between 1740 and 1756 Gohad occupied Gwalior Fort. From 1761 to 1775 Dholpur was annexed to Bharatpur State and between 1782 and December 1805 Dholpur was again annexed by Gwalior. On 10 January 1806 Dholpur became a British protectorate and in the same year the Ruler of Gohad merged Gohad into Dholpur.

British colonial period (c. 1817–1948 CE) 

The arrival of the British East India Company in the region led to the administrative designation of some geographically, culturally, economically and historically diverse areas, which had never shared a common political identity, under the name of the Rajputana Agency. This was a significant identifier, being modified later to Rajputana Province and lasting until the renaming to Rajasthan in 1949. The Company officially recognized various entities, although sources disagree concerning the details, and also included Ajmer-Merwara, which was the only area under direct British control. Of these areas, Marwar and Jaipur were the most significant in the early 19th century, although it was Mewar that gained particular attention from James Tod, a Company employee who was enamoured of Rajputana and wrote extensively, if often uncritically, of the people, history and geography of the Agency as a whole.

Alliances were formed between the Company and these various princely and chiefly entities in the early 19th century, accepting British sovereignty in return for local autonomy and protection from the Marathas and Pindari depredations. Following the Mughal tradition and more importantly due to its strategic location Ajmer became a province of British India, while the autonomous Rajput states, the Muslim state of Tonk, and the Jat states of Bharatpur, Dholpur were organized into the Rajputana Agency.

In 1817–1818, the British Government concluded treaties of alliance with almost all the states of Rajputana. Thus began the British rule over Rajasthan, then called Rajputana.

British Princely States of Rajputana Agency are-

 Maratha Confederacy
 Jaisalmer State
 Bikaner State
 Jodhpur State
 Jaipur State
 Udaipur State
 Alwar State
 Kishangarh State
 Dungarpur State
 Sirohi State
 Banswara State
 Kota State
 Bundi State
 Bharatpur State
 Karauli State
 Dholpur State

Later these states start merged in 1948 CE and in seven phases unification of present Rajasthan completed in 1956 CE.

Post-independence (c. 1948 CE–present) 

The name of Rajasthan as Rajputana became more pronounced or Popular in 12th century before Ghurid invasions, also Rajput as a separate caste emerge in Indian social structure around that time in 12th century. The Kachwaha Rajput clan migrated to the region and made Amber their capital in the 12th century and for 600 years continued to be a political centre.

It took seven stages to form Rajasthan as defined today. In March 1948 the Matsya Union consisted of Alwar, Bharatpur, Dhaulpur and Karauli was formed. Also, in March 1948 Banswara, Bundi, Dungarpur, Jhalawar, Kishangarh, Kota, Pratapgarh, Shahpura and Tonk joined the Indian union and formed a part of Rajasthan. In April 1948 Udaipur joined the state and the Maharana of Udaipur was made Rajpramukh. Therefore, in 1948 the merger of south and southeastern states was almost complete. Still retaining their independence from India were Jaipur State and the desert kingdoms of Bikaner, Jodhpur, and Jaisalmer. From a security point of view, it was claimed that it was vital to the new Indian Union to ensure that the desert kingdoms were integrated into the new nation. The princes finally agreed to sign the Instrument of Accession, and the kingdoms of Bikaner, Jodhpur, Jaisalmer and Jaipur acceded in March 1949. This time, the Maharaja of Jaipur, Man Singh II, was made the Rajpramukh of the state and Jaipur became its capital. Later in 1949, the United States of Matsya, comprising the former kingdoms of Bharatpur, Alwar, Karauli and Dholpur, was incorporated into Rajasthan. On January 26, 1950, 18 states of united Rajasthan merged with Sirohi to join the state leaving Abu and Dilwara to remain a part of Greater Bombay and now Gujarat.

Gurumukh Nihal Singh was appointed as first governor of Rajasthan. Hiralal Shastri was the first nominated chief minister of the state, taking office on 7 April 1949. He was succeeded by two other nominated holders of the office before Tika Ram Paliwal became the first elected chief minister from 3 March 1951.

In November 1956, under the provisions of the States Re-organisation Act, the erstwhile part 'C' state of Ajmer, Abu Road Taluka, former part of Sirohi princely state (which were merged in former Bombay), State and Sunel-Tappa region of the former Madhya Bharat merged with Rajasthan and Sironj sub district of Jhalawar was transferred to Madhya Pradesh. Thus giving the existing boundary Rajasthan. Today with further reorganisation of the states of Uttar Pradesh, Madhya Pradesh and Bihar. Rajasthan has become the largest state of the Indian Republic.

The princes of the former kingdoms were constitutionally granted handsome remuneration in the form of privy purses and privileges to assist them in the discharge of their financial obligations. In 1970, Indira Gandhi, who was then the Prime Minister of India, commenced under-takings to discontinue the privy purses, which were abolished in 1971. Many of the former princes still continue to use the title of Maharaja, but the title has little power other than as a status symbol. Many of the Maharajas still hold their palaces and have converted them into profitable hotels, while some have made good in politics. The democratically elected Government runs the state with a chief minister as its executive head and the governor as the head of the state. Currently, including the new district of Pratapgarh, there are 33 districts, 105 sub-divisions, 37,889 villages, 241 tehsils and 222 towns in Rajasthan.

 List of Chief Ministers of Rajasthan
 List of governors of Rajasthan

See also

 Rajasthan
 Matsya Kingdom
 Outline of Rajasthan
 List of Rajput dynasties
 List of battles of Rajasthan
 Timeline of history of Rajasthan

References 
Notes

Citations

Bibliography 

 
  Primary source.

Further reading